Obzor Hill (‘Halm Obzor’ \'h&lm ob-'zor\) is the hill rising to 479 m at the northeast tip of Trinity Peninsula, Antarctic Peninsula. It surmounts Mott Snowfield to the west.

The feature is named after the town of Obzor in eastern Bulgaria.

Location
German-British mapping in 1996.

Maps
 Trinity Peninsula. Scale 1:250000 topographic map No. 5697. Institut für Angewandte Geodäsie and British Antarctic Survey, 1996.
 Antarctic Digital Database (ADD). Scale 1:250000 topographic map of Antarctica. Scientific Committee on Antarctic Research (SCAR). Since 1993, regularly upgraded and updated.

Notes

References
 Bulgarian Antarctic Gazetteer. Antarctic Place-names Commission. (details in Bulgarian, basic data in English)
 Obzor Hill. SCAR Composite Antarctic Gazetteer

External links
 Obzor Hill. Copernix satellite image

Hills of Trinity Peninsula
Bulgaria and the Antarctic